The  is a class of destroyer serving with the Japan Maritime Self-Defense Force (JMSDF). This warship is the slightly modified class of second-generation, general-purpose destroyers of the JMSDF.

Background
Since FY1991, the JMSDF started construction of the second-generation, . These destroyers are generally satisfactory for the fleet, but there is some discontent. From FY1998 onwards, a slightly modified version that corrected these dissatisfaction points was to be built: Takanami class.

Design
The hull design is generally based on the one of the Murasame class. However, the weapons mounted are different, and as a result, the internal structure has also been changed. The large lattice mast affected the stealthiness of the Murasame class, so in Takanami class, it was planned to change to two small masts, but that was not implemented.

Although their displacement become slightly increased, there was no change to their main engines, as it was not a big difference that had little effect on the performance of the ship.

Equipment
The combat system was slightly improved. The combat direction system is similar to the Murasame class in the first three ships, but in the fourth ship, workstations were changed to AN/UYQ-70, and in the fifth ship, it corresponded to the communication in Link 16. Radars are the same as those of Murasame class, sonars are also small revision type.

In terms of weaponry, instead of the 3-inch gun that has been adopted by conventional destroyers, a larger Oto Melara 127 mm gun was introduced. Although vertical launching systems were divided into two places in the Murasame class, 16-cell Mk 41 for VL-ASROC on the bow deck and 16-cell Mk 48 for Sea Sparrow (later replaced with Evolved Sea Sparrow) on the middle deck, they are compiled in one place, 32-cell Mk 41 on the bow deck in this class.

Ships in the class

See also
 List of naval ship classes in service

References

Books

Article

External links

 GlobalSecurity.org; JMSDF DD Takanami Class
 MaritimeQuest Onami DD-111 Photo Gallery
Naval Technology.com
JMSDF home page 

 
Destroyer classes